Suchodol is a municipality and village in Příbram District in the Central Bohemian Region of the Czech Republic. It has about 400 inhabitants.

Administrative parts
The village of Líha is an administrative part of Suchodol.

History
The first written mention of Suchodol is from 1360.

References

Villages in Příbram District